Bian Clancy FIStructE, FICE, FCIOB is a British structural engineer born in 1940 in London.

Early life and education 
After graduating from University College London with a degree in Civil Engineering Clancy started working at Oscar Faber Consulting Engineers (now AECOM) where he worked as a Resident engineer building a reinforced concrete silo and a large warehouse.

Career 
In 1966 Clancy moved to Manchester with his new wife Mo to work for C S Allott & Son now Jacobs since 2004. In 1969 he set up his own practice with a colleague but branched out on his own in 1972. The company became Clancy Consulting Chartered Consulting Engineers. When Clancy resigned from the company in 1999 it had grown to 130 staff with offices in 4 UK cities. Clancy was a Local Councillor for Sale between 1971-78  and Magistrate 1979-2007  and member of the Board of Governors of the University of Manchester 
Clancy was President of the Institution of Structural Engineers in 1996-97. The Clancy Award named after him. is to the author(s) of a paper published in The Structural Engineer on the whole-life management of structures. Clancy has worked on the subsidence and inspection of low-rise buildings

Awards and honours 
Visiting Professor Liverpool John Moores University 1996-2010 
Sir Arnold Waters Medal 2007 Institution of Structural Engineers
University of Manchester Medal of Honour 2006

Selected projects 
 Matchpoint Tennis Centre in South Manchester in South Manchester, 
 Reconstruction of (part of) The Victorian Pavilion, Buxton, Derbyshire

References

External links
  Institution of Structural Engineers

Presidents of the Institution of Structural Engineers
Structural engineers
1940 births
Living people